Pilot Butte Dam (National ID # WY01381) is a dam in Fremont County, Wyoming.

The earthen dam was constructed in 1926 by the United States Bureau of Reclamation, with a height of 64 feet (19.5 km), and a length of 55 feet (16.8 km) at its crest.  It provides offstream storage for flood control and irrigation water as part of the larger Riverton unit of the extensive Pick–Sloan Missouri Basin Program.  The dam is owned by the Bureau, and operated by the local Midvale Irrigation District.

The reservoir it creates, Pilot Butte Reservoir, has a normal water surface of 1.4 square miles (3.6 sq km), and a maximum capacity of 36,900 acre-feet.  Recreation includes fishing (for trout, ling, and crappie, etc.), hunting, boating, camping and hiking.

References 

Dams in Wyoming
Hydroelectric power plants in Wyoming
Reservoirs in Wyoming
United States Bureau of Reclamation dams
Dams completed in 1926
Buildings and structures in Fremont County, Wyoming
Bodies of water of Fremont County, Wyoming